The Panasonic Lumix DMC-LX100 is a 13 MP large sensor compact camera with a Four Thirds sensor announced by Panasonic on September 15, 2014. LX100 features an F1.7-2.8 24-75mm equivalent Leica-branded lens, 2764k dot Electronic viewfinder, 3" 921k dot LCD, built-in wireless and it can  record 4K (Ultra HD) video at 30p or Full HD at 60p. Since August 22, 2018, there is the successor Lumix DC-LX100 II, which has an image sensor with 22 MP resolution and a 3" LCD touch-sensitive screen with 1.24 million dots.

References

http://www.dpreview.com/products/panasonic/compacts/panasonic_dmclx100/specifications

LX100
Digital cameras with CMOS image sensor